Herwig Bayer (born 13 February 1963) is an Austrian swimmer. He competed in two events at the 1980 Summer Olympics.

References

External links
 

1963 births
Living people
Austrian male swimmers
Olympic swimmers of Austria
Swimmers at the 1980 Summer Olympics
Sportspeople from Klagenfurt